= Al-Faisaly =

Al-Faisaly (الفيصلي) may refer to:

- Al-Faisaly SC, a football club based in Amman, Jordan
- Al-Faisaly FC, a football club based in Harmah, Saudi Arabia
